Maera irregularis is a species of crustacean in the genus Maera. It lives in Kuwait.

References

Maeridae
Animals described in 2016